Welsh 3000s are the 15 Welsh Furths (or Welsh Munros). Geographically they fall within three ranges, but close enough to make it possible to reach all 15 summits within 24 hours, a challenge known as the Welsh 3000s challenge.

Background

Most people undertaking the challenge walk it, and many achieve it in much less than 24 hours. The record for the challenge (from first peak to last) stands at 4 hours 10 minutes and 48 seconds, set by Finlay Wild in 2019. On 5 August 1989 a ladies' record was set by Angela Carson with a time of 5 hours 28 minutes and 21 seconds. On 17/18 June 1978 John Wagstaff of West Bromwich Mountaineering Club completed a triple crossing in 22 hours 49 minutes, a feat which has yet to be repeated.

The walk is also known as "The 14 Peaks": Carnedd Gwenllian (or "Garnedd Uchaf") is not always included, as it has the least relative height, being little more than a bump on the ridge rather than a separate summit in its own right. Many people choose to make the small diversion to include it on their traverse. There is also an option to include a sixteenth top, Castell y Gwynt in the Glyder range, which has been reclassified as a Nuttall since a survey in 2007.

The Snowdonia Society maintains a public database of persons visiting the 14 peaks in a single journey.

The Challenge

The Welsh 3000s Challenge involves standing on top of all the 3000 ft peaks within 24 hours, using no transport. While challengers can choose any route and summit the mountains in any order, anyone seeking to beat the record must start on Snowdon. Many walkers and runners prefer the alternative route, starting with Crib Goch, then visiting Garnedd Ugain before summiting Snowdon. Some challengers ascend Snowdon the night before, and sleep on the summit; others use the Mountain Railway to ascend Snowdon. Those who wish to climb all the mountains, rather than just standing at all the summits, often choose the Crib Goch route, starting at Pen-y-pass.

References

External links

Information for those attempting the Welsh 3000s Challenge
The Snowdonia Society's 14 peaks website
The Welsh 3000s Map with GPS waypoints + GPX Route

See also 

 List of highest mountains in Wales

Llanllechid
Mountains and hills of Wales
Athletics in Wales
Hewitts of Wales
Marilyns of Wales
Nuttalls
Recreational walks in Wales
Challenge walks
Fell running challenges
Welsh peaks by listing